This list contains former characters and cast members of the ITV soap opera Emmerdale, in order of last on-screen appearance, beginning with the most recent.



2020s

Last appeared in 2023

Last appeared in 2022

Last appeared in 2021

Last appeared in 2020

2010s

Last appeared in 2019

Last appeared in 2018

Last appeared in 2017

Last appeared in 2016

Last appeared in 2015

Last appeared in 2014

Last appeared in 2013

Last appeared in 2012

Last appeared in 2011

Last appeared in 2010

2000s

Last appeared in 2009

Last appeared in 2008

Last appeared in 2007

Last appeared in 2006

Last appeared in 2005

Last appeared in 2004

Last appeared in 2003

Last appeared in 2002

Last appeared in 2001

Last appeared in 2000

1990s

Last appeared in 1999

Last appeared in 1998

Last appeared in 1997

Last appeared in 1996

Last appeared in 1995

Last appeared in 1994

Last appeared in 1993

Last appeared in 1992

Last appeared in 1991

Last appeared in 1990

1980s

Last appeared in 1989

Last appeared in 1988

Last appeared in 1987

Last appeared in 1986

Last appeared in 1985

Last appeared in 1984

Last appeared in 1983

Last appeared in 1982

Last appeared in 1981

Last appeared in 1980

1970s

Last appeared in 1979

Last appeared in 1978

Last appeared in 1977

Last appeared in 1976

Last appeared in 1975

Last appeared in 1974

Last appeared in 1973

Last appeared in 1972

References

 
Lists of former characters